Allan Balmain FRS FRSE is Barbara Bass Bakar Distinguished Professor of Cancer Genetics at the University of California, San Francisco (UCSF).

Education
Balmain was educated at the University of Glasgow where he was awarded a Bachelor of Science degree in chemistry in 1966, followed by a PhD on the organic chemistry of terpenoids in 1969.

Awards and honours
Balmain was elected a Fellow of the Royal Society (FRS) in 2015. His certificate of election reads: 

Balmain was also elected a Fellow of the Royal Society of Edinburgh (FRSE) in 1995.

References

Living people
Fellows of the Royal Society
Fellows of the Royal Society of Edinburgh
Alumni of the University of Glasgow
University of California, San Francisco faculty
Year of birth missing (living people)